Dr. Milind Mane (was born 3 December 1970) was a member of the 13th Maharashtra Legislative Assembly. He represented the Nagpur North Assembly Constituency. He belongs to the Bharatiya Janata Party (BJP) Mane has been a corporator in the Nagpur Municipal Corporation, in 2012, as sitting corporator, he unsuccessfully contested the municipal corporation elections representing the RPI Aghadi. Mane is a medical doctor.

Early life
Mane was born in Paras village of Akola district. His father was a gateman with the Indian Railways, who was an alcoholic, the family sunk in poverty. His mother therefore had to supplement the family income by working as a labourer. Poverty forced Mane as a child and youth to do various types of farm jobs, hawking and menial work, and at one time he was forced to beg for a living for several days. He studied dentistry for six months, however he shifted to studying medicine on obtaining admission tondira Gandhi Government Medical college, from where he secured his MBBS degree. He subsequently secured his MD degree.

Political career

Positions held

Within BJP

 MLA in 2014 by defeating Cabinet Minister Nitin Raut

Legislative

 BJP MLA in 2014 Maharashtra Legislative Assembly 
Mane is a vocal supporter of LGBTQ rights in the region. He is known to have spoken in various LGBTQ events aout he importance of sex education in school and discrimination against the LGBTQ community. During his tenure as North Nagpur MLA, he flagged off the first Orange City LGBTQ Pride March in Nagpur in 2016.

References

Politicians from Nagpur
Living people
Maharashtra MLAs 2014–2019
People from Akola district
1970 births
Marathi politicians
Bharatiya Janata Party politicians from Maharashtra